Saint-Contest is a commune in the Calvados department in the Normandy region in northwestern France.

Population

Administration

Mayors of Saint-Contest

International relations
Saint-Contest is twinned with:
 Marchwood, near Southampton, Hampshire, United Kingdom.

See also
Buron
Communes of the Calvados department

References

Communes of Calvados (department)
Calvados communes articles needing translation from French Wikipedia